The Gift of Speed is a 2004 novel by Australian author Steven Carroll. It is the second in a sequence of novels, following The Art of the Engine Driver and followed by The Time We Have Taken.

Awards

Miles Franklin Literary Award, 2005: shortlisted

Reviews
"The Age"
Readings

2004 Australian novels
Novels set in Melbourne
HarperCollins books